Luisa Geisler (born 1991 in Canoas) is a Brazilian writer.

At the age of 19 she was awarded the 2010 Prêmio Sesc de Literatura (Sesc Prize for Literature) for her debut book, the short story collection Contos de Mentira. She won again the following year for the novel category with Quiçá.

In 2012, she was chosen to be part of the Granta short story collection for the Best Young Brazilian Writers. Geisler was the youngest writer to be selected for the collection.

Bibliography
 Contos de Mentira: short story, 2011
 Quiçá, (novel), 2012
Granta Best of Young Brazilian Novelists, (anthology; with the short story "Lion"), 2012

See also
 Brazilian literature

References

External links
 (Portuguese language)

1991 births
Living people
Brazilian women novelists
Brazilian women short story writers
21st-century Brazilian novelists
21st-century Brazilian short story writers
21st-century Brazilian women writers